Philiris dinawa is a species of butterfly of the family Lycaenidae. It is found in Papua New Guinea.

References

Butterflies described in 1908
Luciini